Constantijn à Renesse (1626 – 1680), was a Dutch Golden Age painter and pupil of Rembrandt.

Biography
He was born in Maarssen to the son of Frederick Henry, Prince of Orange's military chaplain. He moved with his family to Breda and was sent to Leiden to the University, where besides literature studies he also took drawing lessons from Rembrandt in 1649. He moved to Eindhoven in 1653 where he later died.
He is known for religious prints and drawings and is documented working with Rembrandt on paintings of religious subjects.

References

Constantijn Daniel van Renesse on Artnet

External links

1626 births
1680 deaths
Dutch Golden Age painters
Dutch male painters
Dutch Golden Age printmakers
People from Maarssen
Pupils of Rembrandt